The House's Chimney, named after American climber Bill House, is a  tall crack in a rock wall, located on K2, a mountain on the China–Pakistan border. It was determined as the safest route to climb higher up the mountain, located at an elevation of  feet. It was first climbed and named after Bill House, when he free climbed it on the 1938 American K2 expedition.

References

K2
Rock formations of Asia